Point Baker (Lingít: X̱aaséedák’u) is a census-designated place (CDP) in Prince of Wales-Hyder Census Area, Alaska, United States. The population was 12 at the 2020 census, down from 15 in 2010 and 35 in 2000.

Geography
Point Baker is located at  (56.352425, −133.628479).

Climate

History
In 1975, Point Baker and Port Protection made national news when Zieske v Butz, a landmark lawsuit against the US Forest Service brought by Pnt Baker residents Charles Zieske, Alan Stein, and Herb Zieske, was decided by Judge James von der Heydt, the Alaska Federal District court judge. The lawsuit was initiated by Alan Stein and the Point Baker Association which had about 30 fishermen members from the communities of Pt baker and Port Protection. On December 24, 1975, von der Hedyt issued an injunction against all clearcutting on the North end of the Prince of Wales island  from Red Bay to Calder Bay. Congress lifted the injunction when it passed the National Forest Management Act in 1976.

Twice more Pt Baker an Port Protection made headlines in 1989, in a landmark lawsuit called Stein v Barton, many of its residents fought for buffer strips on all the salmon streams of the Tongass and for protection of the Salmon Bay watershed. In the 1990 Tongass Timber Reform Act, lobbyists for an environmental group in Washington compromised with Senator Ted Stevens and only got part of the Salmon Bay watershed protected. The timber surrounding an important salmon stream was bargained away.  This statute also protected all the salmon streams in the Tongass with  buffer strips during logging operations.

In February 2010, Senators Murkowski and Begich are pushing Senate Bill 881 through Congress.  The bill has gone through extensive community meetings and subsequently the bill has changed and controversial areas, such as north Prince of Wales, have been removed from the draft bill.  The draft bill privatizes significant acreage of National Forest Land by conveying it into the exclusive ownership of SEALASKA, a native Alaskan corporation.

In 2011, having failed to pass S 881 and almost lost her seat as a result to Joe Miller in the election, Murkowski introduced S 730. Nine Alaskan towns have opposed the bill so far. Sealaska would get the largest volume class timber remaining which is vital to protecting wolves and goshawks, both of which could be listed as endangered.

Recently a recall petition has been launched from Pt Baker's sister community, Edna Bay 
http://www.ednabayalaska.net/

Demographics

Point Baker first appeared on the 1940 U.S. Census as an unincorporated village. It reappeared on the 1950 census. It did not report again until 1980, when it was made a census-designated place (CDP).

As of the census of 2000, there were 35 people, 13 households, and 9 families residing in the CDP. The population density was 36.4 people per square mile (1.41/km2). There were 23 housing units at an average density of 23.9/sq mi (9.3/km2). The racial makeup of the CDP was 91.43% White, 2.86% Native American, and 5.71% from two or more races.

There were 13 households, out of which 23.1% had children under the age of 18 living with them, 61.5% were married couples living together, 15.4% had a female householder with no husband present, and 23.1% were non-families, 15.4% of all households were made up of individuals, and 7.7% had someone living alone who was 65 years of age or older. The average household size was 2.69 and the average family size was 3.00.

In the CDP, the age distribution of the population shows 25.7% under the age of 18, 2.9% from 18 to 24, 25.7% from 25 to 44, 25.7% from 45 to 64, and 20.0% who were 65 years of age or older. The median age was 43 years. For every 100 females, there were 105.9 males. For every 100 females age 18 and over, there were 116.7 males.

The median income for a household in the CDP was $28,000, and the median income for a family was $28,250. Males had a median income of $0 versus $31,250 for females. The per capita income for the CDP was $12,580. There were no families and 4.9% of the population living below the poverty line, including no under eighteens and none of those over 64.

References

Census-designated places in Alaska
Census-designated places in Prince of Wales–Hyder Census Area, Alaska
Census-designated places in Unorganized Borough, Alaska
Populated coastal places in Alaska on the Pacific Ocean